Zvoncekova Bilježnica (Serbian Cyrillic: Звонцекова Биљежница; trans. Zvoncek's Notebook) is a Serbian punk rock/hardcore punk band from Aranđelovac.

History 
The band was formed in 1988 by the former Kralj Vuk member Svetislav Todorović "Tozza Rabassa" (vocal) with Darko Branković (backing vocals),  Dejan Novaković "Fumarone" (bass), Dragan Vesković "Vesko" (drums), Dragan Mitić (guitar) and Vlada Janković (guitar). By the end of 1988, the band had already started performing live and released their official demo release, studio release, Lorka nije pisao moju pesmu (Lorca Did Not Write My Song).

In 1991, the band released a live compilation album consisting of selected live recordings made from 1988 until 1991 entitled Retrospektiva '88-'91 (A Retrospective '88-91), after which the band lineup had changed and on the departure of the remaining members, Todorović, with KBO! members Saša Vujić "Vuja" (guitar) and Slobodan Vujić "Boban" (drums), continued working, but moving towards a more melodic punk rock sound.

The new lineup started recording new material at the Kragujevac Češnjak studio, owned by the Vujić brothers. The recordings resulted in the release of the second demo album Inženjeri ljudskih duša (Human Soul Engineers), which got the name by a Stalin's definition for artists, which beside their own material also featured cover versions of the Devo song "Mongoloid" and the Termiti song "Vjeran pas" ("Faithful Dog").

Two years later, in 1994, the band released their first studio album, Mrzim svoju mesnu zajednicu (I Hate My Municipality), released by Take It Or Leave It Records on both MC and 300 copy limited edition LP, featuring a cover version of the Paraf single "Moj život je novi val" ("My Life is New Wave"). The album, recorded at the Češnak studio from December 1993 until March 1994 and produced by Saša Vujić, also featured the original band members Dragan Vesković "Vesko" (harp, oboe) and Dejan Novaković "Fumarone" (bass). In order to promote the album, the band recorded their first promotional video, for the track "A slanina, slanina forever" ("But Bacon, Bacon Forever").

In 1996, the band performed at the Belgrade KST at a concert organized by the TV Politika show Paket Aranžman (Package Deal), featuring prominent Serbian bands performed cover versions of punk songs, and the live versions of "Moj život je novi val", "Mongoloid" and "Vjeran pas", recorded at the event, were released on the live various artists compilation Punk You All by Hi-Fi Centar. At the fifth anniversary celebration of the Paket Aranžman TV show, the band appeared as one of the performers and the live versions of the songs "Balkanski varvari" ("Barbarians from The Balkans") and "Aluvijalne ravni" ("Alluvial Plains") appeared on the live various artists compilation Svi protiv svih (Everybody Against Everyone), released in 1998 by Hi-Fi Centar.

During the same year, the band founded their own independent record label Neprijatelj Prelazi Rijeku Records (The Enemy Is Crossing the River Records) under which they released their second studio album Gavrilov princip (Gavrilo's Principle, a pun for Gavrilo Princip's name), produced by Saša Vujić, which, beside the three, also featured the bassist Nenad Jakovljević "Jakob". Not minding the witty titles, the material, including "Toširo Mifune A Kolo", "Koka Kolo", "Ska kolo" and "Dilerovo kolo", dealt with serious social topics.

In 2002, Todorović and Saša Vujić had cameo appearances in the Ðorde Milosavljević movie Ringeraja, performing a cover version of the Indexi hit "Bacila je sve niz rijeku" ("She Had Thrown Away Everything Down The River").

On early 2011, the band started a mini-tour promoting the upcoming studio album '’Beš muziku uz koju ne može da se igra (Fuck The Music You Cannot Dance To), expected to be released during the same year. In 2013, the band released the single "Samo pravo" ("Just Straight Ahead"), featuring rock journalist Petar Janjatović as guest.

In the autumn of 2014, the band participated in a tribute album to Novembar, entitled Tako mlad i tako čist (So Young and So Clean), with a cover of Novembar song "Buntovnik" ("Rebell").

Discography

Official demo releases 
 Lorka nije pisao moju pesmu (1988)
 Inženjeri ljudskih duša (1992)

Studio albums 
 Mrzim svoju mesnu zajednicu (1994)
 Gavrilov princip (1998)
 'Beš muziku uz koju ne može da se igra (2016)

Live albums 
 Retrospektiva '88-'91 (1991)

Other appearances 
 "Moj život je novi val" / "Mongoloid" / "Vjeran pas" (Punk You All; 1998)
 "Balkanski varvari" / "Aluvijalne ravni" (Svi protiv svih; 1998)
 "Buntovnik" (Tako mlad i tako čist; 2014)

References 

 EX YU ROCK enciklopedija 1960–2006, Janjatović Petar;

External links 
 Zvoncekova Bilježnica at Myspace
 Zvoncekova Bilježnica at Facebook
 Zvoncekova Bilježnica at YouTube
 Zvoncekova Bilježnica at Discogs
 Zvoncekova Bilježnica at Last.fm

Serbian punk rock groups
Serbian hardcore punk groups
Yugoslav punk rock groups
Musical groups established in 1988